The Furor class was a type of destroyers of the Spanish Navy, similar to the units of the , or 27 knotters, of the British Royal Navy. Commissioned in 1896 by the then Minister of the Navy Admiral Beranger after the success of the design by Fernando Villaamil of the warship , which had given name to a whole typology of vessels.

Description 
Although of the same series, there were differences in size, armament, and machinery between the six Furor-class destroyers. The first two (Furor and Terror) are sometimes considered a subseries. They were considered sleek and elegant ships for the time, able to use their speed to hunt any contemporary torpedo boat. The Furor class' main function was to serve as escort to the larger capital ships and protect them against the torpedo boats, while also hunting the latter.

The construction of the six ships that were manufactured were ordered from the shipyards of J & G Thompson of Clydebank (Scotland), being praised in its design by the Royal Navy.

Armament 
The Furor class were vessels that, despite their small size of only 380 tons, had a strong armament. For the main armament the ships were equipped with two semi-automatic  Nordenfelt guns, one forward on the bow and another to aft, and two Nordenfelt  cannon one on each side amidships. Secondary armament consisted of two automatic  Maxim machine guns with a similar placement, as well as two  torpedo tubes.

Armor 
Armor on the Furor-class ships was non-existent, and although the hull was made of steel, any impact of a medium caliber could (and indeed did in the Battle of Santiago de Cuba) leave them out of action.

History 
These ships had their baptism of fire in the naval Battle of Santiago de Cuba, where despite the efforts of Fernando Villaamil were incorrectly used. Pluton and Furor were present at the battle while Terror had suffered damage prior to arriving at Cuba and had returned to Puerto Rico.

After the Spanish–American War began, the American fleet planned to blockade the Spanish ships in the Bay of Santiago de Cuba and expected a favorable outcome through the use of ground forces which would allow the entire Spanish fleet to be captured intact. To this end the American fleet tried blocking the entrance to the bay of Santiago by sinking the old collier Merrimack, but was intercepted by the cruiser  and Pluton, who managed to sink it before it blocked the canal. The Spanish fleet was outnumbered and outgunned by the encroaching American fleet and would have to try to run through the gauntlet of American ships to escape. Captain Villamil, in charge of both Pluton and Furor, proposed to launch a surprise night attack with torpedoes but was overruled by the ranking Admiral Cervera.

On the morning of July 3, 1898, behind the protected cruiser , the Spanish fleet attempted to run the blockade and escape from Cuba. Charging against a clearly superior force, in which there were three battleships, an armored cruiser, and two protected cruisers, the fleet suffered major damage in a short period. With the limited artillery aboard Pluton and Furor they could do little against the enemy. Furor sank quickly at 10:50 with Villamil aboard. His body was never recovered. Meanwhile, Pluton was run aground at 10:45 near Cabanas Bay. The two destroyers would lose  of their crew.

Terror was repaired on June 12, 1898, at the port of San Juan, Puerto Rico. The port at the time was being blocked by the US auxiliary cruiser USS Saint Paul. On June 22, 1898, Terror made an exit along with the unprotected cruiser  with the intention of attacking the American ship. When Terror was at an optimal distance for a torpedo attack, she suffered a direct impact from an artillery shell which, although it did not explode, breached the ship's hull, forcing it to retreat protected by the artillery fire of the Isabel II.

Ships of the class 
Six ships of the Furor class were built

References
 Nofi, Albert A. The Spanish–American War, 1898. Conshohocken, Pennsylvania: Combined Books, 1996.